TheTöpperschloot is a canal in the area of Poggenkrug, Willen, in the district Wittmund in East Frisia . It rises at the Bundesstraße 210 and flows approximately 1200 feet south-southeast into the Poggenkruger Leide.

References

Wittmund (district)
Canals in Lower Saxony